Kerfalla Yansané is a Guinean diplomat serving as Ambassador of the Republic of Guinea in the United States since 2018.

A lawyer by training, he got his first position in the faculty of law at Dakar and then in 1985 he was named Governor of the Central Bank of the Republic of Guinea. He initiated various reforms in this organisation. He was dismissed in 1996 after the military uprising. In 2010 he was reappointed by the transitional government directed by Prime Minister Jean Marie Doré and in December he was retained in his post by the new, democratically elected President, Alpha Condé. He was Minister of Economy and Finance from 2010 to 2014.

He was appointed ambassador on November 24, 2017. Two months later, Ambassador Yansané presented his credentials to President Donald Trump at the White House on January 24, 2018.

References 

Economy ministers of Guinea
Finance ministers of Guinea
Mining ministers of Guinea
Governors of the Central Bank of Guinea
Ambassadors of Guinea to the United States
Living people
Susu people
Year of birth missing (living people)